The Akaflieg Berlin B1 Charlotte (named after the university at Charlottenburg), was a glider built in Germany in the 1920s. It featured a high-wing, tailless sailplane configuration of all-wood construction, which had a pair of skids for landing.

Design and development
Hermann Winter and Edmund Pfister shared the design work for the "Charlotte", hoping to compete at the 2nd Rhön competition at the Wasserkuppe. Progress was slow as Pfister had a full-time job to fulfill. Professor Winter was determined to compete at the next Rhön meeting, so he engaged the Sablatnig Works for completion of the glider, which went on to win at the Wasserkuppe in August 1922.

Specifications (B 1)

See also
List of gliders

References

1920s German sailplanes
Akaflieg Berlin aircraft
Aircraft first flown in 1922
Tailless aircraft